Luise Erhard ( Lotter; formerly Schuster; 18 April 1893 – 9 July 1975) was a German economist and the wife of Ludwig Erhard, former Chancellor of the Federal Republic of Germany.

Biography
Luise Lotter was born in Langenzenn and later moved to Fürth; she lived in the same neighborhood as her future husband Ludwig Erhard and was friends with his sister. In 1914, she married Friedrich Schuster, a lawyer, but he was killed a year later while serving in the First World War. She encountered Erhard again while studying business management and accounting in Nuremberg in 1919, and they married in 1923. Luise had a daughter from her first marriage, Eleanore, and had a second daughter, Elizabeth, with Erhard.

Although she was an accomplished economist in her own right, Luise Erhard placed her career on hold in order to support her husband's political career. Ludwig Erhard served as Chancellor from 1963 until 1966. A 1964 profile in The New York Times noted that "In matters of economics, Luise Erhard, it is said, is one of the German Chancellor's most valued counselors. ... Whatever advice she gives remains private. She prefers homemaking to public life."

References

1893 births
1975 deaths
Spouses of chancellors of Germany
German economists
German women economists
People from Fürth
People from Langenzenn